Alycaeus balingensis is a species of land snail with a gill and an operculum, a terrestrial gastropod mollusk in the Cyclophoridae family.

Distribution 
The distribution of A. balingensis is limited to the limestone karst at Bukit Baling, Kedah, Peninsular Malaysia.

Conservation
A. balingensis is threatened by habitat destruction due to ongoing quarrying activities.

References

Cyclophoridae
Invertebrates of Malaysia
Gastropods described in 1948